Raimundo Calcagno, popularly known as Calki, (29 October 1906 – 4 September 1982) was an Argentine film critic, journalist, and screenwriter. He started writing reviews in El Mundo in the 1930s. In 1943 he wrote the script for Luis Bayón Herrera's La piel de zapa, and also collaborated in writing the script for  Román Viñoly Barreto's  Con el sudor de tu frente (1949) and  Manuel Antín's Intimidad de los parques  (1965).

References

External links
 

Argentine film critics
Argentine journalists
Male journalists
Male screenwriters
1906 births
1982 deaths
Writers from Buenos Aires
20th-century Argentine screenwriters
20th-century Argentine male writers
20th-century journalists